The women's 1500 metres at the 2017 World Championships in Athletics was held at the London Olympic Stadium on  and 7 August.

Summary
In the final Laura Muir (Great Britain) made her way to the front to set the early pace, marked closely by the Olympic champion Faith Kipyegon (Kenya).  After a 2:17 first 800 metres, Kipyegon took the lead.  After running at the back of the pack, marking world record holder Genzebe Dibaba (Ethiopia), Sifan Hassan (Netherlands) ran around the field into the lead.  who lead until the final straight, when Kipyegon regained the lead.  Hassan held the lead into the final lap, with Kipyegon on her shoulder.  Hassan would not let Kipyegon by, keeping her on the outside.  Muir tried to stay on the back of the leaders, with Dibaba temporarily joining.  Jennifer Simpson and 800 metre star Caster Semenya rushed to keep up, while Dibaba disappeared from contention.  Sprinting the entire last lap, Hassan held the lead until the final straightaway when Kipyegon was able to edge ahead.  Hassan began to struggle as Muir tried to chase Kipyegon on the outside.  Simpson was sprinting down the inside rail while Semenya was behind her but free from traffic on the far outside.  Simpson had nowhere to go until Hassan drifted to the outside of the first lane, opening a small gap which Simpson squeezed through.  Now with clear running room, Simpson ran past Muir just a few meters before the line to get silver, just behind Kipyegon.  On the outside, a step behind Simpson's rush, Semenya dived at the line to nip Muir for the bronze.

Records
Before the competition records were as follows:

No records were set at the competition.

Qualification standard
The standard to qualify automatically for entry was 4:07.50.

Schedule
The event schedule, in local time (UTC+1), was as follows:

Results

Heats
The first round took place on 4 August in three heats as follows:

The first six in each heat ( Q ) and the next six fastest ( q ) qualified for the semifinals. The overall results were as follows:

Semifinals
The semifinals took place on 5 August in two heats as follows:

The first five in each heat ( Q ) and the next two fastest ( q ) qualified for the final. The overall results were as follows:

Final
The final took place on 7 August at 21:53. The results were as follows (photo finish):

References

1500
1500 metres at the World Athletics Championships
Women's sport in London